Sivert Haugen Bjørnstad (born 3 October 1990) is a Norwegian politician for the Progress Party. He was elected to the Norwegian parliament in the 2013, becoming the parliament's youngest member.

Bjørstad was elected to the Trondheim city council and the Sør-Trøndelag county council in 2011. He was elected 2nd deputy leader of the Progress Party's Youth in 2012.

He studies economy at BI Norwegian Business School in Trondheim.

References 

1990 births
Living people
Progress Party (Norway) politicians
Politicians from Trondheim
21st-century Norwegian politicians